Hoelite is a mineral, discovered in 1922 at Mt. Pyramide, Spitsbergen, Norway and named after Norwegian geologist Adolf Hoel (1879–1964). Its chemical formula is C14H8O2 (9,10-anthraquinone).

It is a very rare organic mineral which occurs in coal fire environments in association with sal ammoniac and native sulfur.

References

Organic minerals
Monoclinic minerals
Minerals in space group 14
Minerals described in 1922